Mordellistena amphicometa is a species of beetle in the genus Mordellistena of the family Mordellidae. It was discovered in 1875.

References

amphicometa
Beetles described in 1875